Église Saint-Jean de Cinarca is a ruined church in Sari-d'Orcino, Corse-du-Sud, western Corsica. The building was classified as a Historic Monument in 1976.

References

Churches in Corsica
Monuments historiques of Corsica
Ruins in France